This is a list of presidents of St. Francis College.

References

St. Francis College
Saint Francis College